Life imprisonment is the most severe criminal sentence available to the State and Territory Supreme Courts in Australia. Most cases attracting the sentence are murder. It is also imposed, albeit rarely, for sexual assault, manufacturing and trafficking commercial quantities of illicit drugs, and offences against the justice system and government security.

As of 2022, there are 418 prisoners in Australia serving a life sentence.

Offences and minimum terms

Mandatory life imprisonment
The death penalty in Australia fell into disuse in 1967, and between then and 1985, each jurisdiction abolished it and (in most cases) replaced it with mandatory life imprisonment.

Mandatory life imprisonment was subsequently abolished in New South Wales in 1982, Victoria in 1986, Tasmania in 1995, and Western Australia in 2008,  though it was reintroduced in  New South Wales in 2011 for the murder of a police officer.

When the death penalty was abolished in the Australian Capital Territory in 1973, there were no offences subject to mandatory life imprisonment. Even so, life imprisonment can be imposed.

Life imprisonment remains mandatory for murder in South Australia, the Northern Territory, and Queensland.

State and territories
The criminal law and prisons are primarily administered by state and territory governments within Australia's federal system. As such, there is considerable divergence of which offences can attract life sentences across Australia.

The minimum non-parole period on a life sentence varies between jurisdictions, and between different crimes attracting the penalty. A life sentence in Western Australia, for a crime other than murder, attracts a minimum non-parole period of seven years, while the equivalent term in Queensland is 15 years. For murder, the minimum non parole period on a life sentence in Australian Capital Territory is 10 years, as it is in Western Australia except when committed during an aggravated home burglary, in which case it is 15 years.

In South Australia, Queensland and Northern Territory, the minimum non-parole period for a life sentence resulting from a murder conviction is 20 years. Though in Queensland, if the victim is known by the offender to be a police officer, the minimum non-parole period is 25 years; in the case of multiple murder victims or where the offender has a prior murder conviction, the minimum non-parole period is 30 years. In Northern Territory, exceptional circumstances can lessen the minimum 20 year non-parole period, but conversely the minimum non-parole for murder in circumstances of aggravation is 25 years. In South Australia, a guilty plea discount can remove 25% of the mandatory 20 year non-parole period.  The minimum non-parole term for a life sentence in Victoria is 30 years, unless a court considers it not in the interest of justice to set such a term.

New South Wales is the only Australian state or territory to provide for a mandatory life without parole sentence, specifically for the offence of murder where the victim was known to be, or ought reasonably to have been known to be a police officer.

Following a string of high-profile ‘coward punch’ related deaths, in 2014 the Queensland government created a new offence of unlawful striking causing death, the maximum penalty for which is life imprisonment.

The Criminal Code of Queensland, Western Australia and Northern Territory provide for life imprisonment for aircraft hijacking, aiding a suicide, terrorism and for perjuring to procure a conviction of an offence punishable by life imprisonment. The Criminal Code of the Northern Territory also provides for life imprisonment for terrorism and aircraft hijacking, as well as for most other serious violent offences.

The Criminal Code of Queensland provides life imprisonment as a mandatory punishment for repeat child sex offences, which cannot be mitigated or varied under any law.

Every state and territory except Tasmania provides for life imprisonment for some drug offences, though Tasmanians remain subject to Commonwealth law, which allows for life imprisonment for some drug offences. Primarily these offences are manufacturing, trafficking or cultivating commercial quantities of controlled drugs and procuring children to do so, and in Queensland, supplying any quantity of particular drugs to children under 16.

Child sexual abuse offences can attract a life sentence in New South Wales, Queensland, South Australia and the Northern Territory. In Queensland, if child sexual abuse was committed by a repeat offender, a life sentence is mandatory and cannot be mitigated or varied under any law. Other offences capable of attracting a sentence of life imprisonment sentence are rape, arson, incest, riot (under aggravated circumstances), piracy and destroying sea walls (Queensland) and treason (Tasmania). In Queensland, the law also provides a maximum punishment of life imprisonment for aircraft hijacking, burglary or unlawful entry into a dwelling (under aggravated circumstances or by means of a break), armed robbery, violent robbery, attempt to commit armed robbery, attempt to commit violent robbery, conspiracy to bring false accusation against another where an innocent person is convicted and punished with life imprisonment for a crime he or she did not commit, rape, aggravated sexual assault, manslaughter, attempted murder, stupefying (poisoning or drugging) with the intent to commit another indictable offence, disabling with intent to commit an indictable offence (choking, suffocating or strangulating or rendering or attempted to render any person incapable of resistance), and most other serious violent offences.

The Australian Capital Territory and Victoria are the only Australian jurisdictions to explicitly prohibit the imposition of life sentences on children.

Commonwealth
Under Commonwealth legislation, there are 68 offences that can attract life imprisonment.

Sixty three such offences are within the Criminal Code Act 1995, including the setting or placing of explosive and lethal devices; treason, treachery and espionage offences; terrorist acts, as well as preparing or planning terrorist acts and financing terrorism; incursions into foreign countries with the intention of engaging in hostile activity and related preparatory conduct (including accumulating weapons, providing or participating in training, giving or receiving goods and services and allowing use of buildings and vehicles to support such offences).

Further offences in the Criminal Code that allow for life imprisonment include crimes against humanity (genocide, war crimes), the murder of UN personnel and various drug offences including manufacturing, trafficking importing and exporting of commercial quantities controlled drugs and plants, cultivating commercial quantities of controlled plants, and procuring children to facilitate similar drug offences.

The Crimes (Aviation) Act 1991 provides for life imprisonment for hijacking offences, destruction of aircraft with intent to kill and prejudicing safe operation of an aircraft with intention to kill, and the Crimes Act 1914 provides for life imprisonment for piracy.

Notable sentences

With non-parole periods
The longest overall non-parole period for a single murder is 45 years and six months, being served by Michael Barry Fyfe (South Australia), who stabbed fellow inmate Trevor Tilley in the kitchen of Yatala Prison in January 1995 while serving a -year sentence for other crimes. The longest non-parole period imposed for a single murder is 35 years, being served by Melbourne CBD gunman Christopher Wayne Hudson (Victoria). The longest non-parole period imposed on a woman is 32 years, being served by South Australian Angelika Gavare, who murdered and dismembered pensioner Vonne McGlynn in November 2008 for financial gain, and Victorian Cai Xia Liao, who repeatedly stabbed Mai Mach and her four-year-old grandson Alistair Kwong with gardening shears in a vicious attack.

Notable prisoners serving at least one life imprisonment with specified non-parole period:

Without the possibility of parole
In the most extreme cases, the sentencing judge will refuse to fix a non-parole period, which means that the prisoner will spend the rest of their life in prison. Notable prisoners serving at least one sentence of life imprisonment without the possibility of parole include:

References

External links
 Life imprisonment in Australia before 1986

Australia
Crime in Australia